Physoconops is a genus of thick-headed flies in the family Conopidae. There are about 13 described species in Physoconops.

Species
 Physoconops analis (Fabricius, 1805)
 Physoconops brachyrhynchus (Macquart, 1843)
 Physoconops bulbirostris (Loew, 1853)
 Physoconops discalis (Williston, 1892)
 Physoconops excisus (Wiedemann, 1830)
 Physoconops floridanus Camras, 1955 (Florida physoconops)
 Physoconops fronto (Williston, 1885)
 Physoconops gracilis (Williston, 1885)
 Physoconops nigrimanus (Bigot, 1887)
 Physoconops obscuripennis (Williston, 1882)
 Physoconops sylvosus (Williston, 1882)
 Physoconops townsendi Camras, 1955
 Physoconops weemsi Camras, 2007

References

Further reading

 Diptera.info
 NCBI Taxonomy Browser, Physoconops
 Arnett, Ross H. (2000). American Insects: A Handbook of the Insects of America North of Mexico. CRC Press.

Conopidae
Conopoidea genera